Kevin J. Cavanaugh is an American politician from the state of New Hampshire. A Democrat, Cavanaugh has represented the 16th district in the New Hampshire Senate since 2017, winning a special election to succeed deceased fellow Democrat Scott McGilvray. Senator Cavanaugh serves as chair of Senate Commerce, and vice chair of the Executive Departments & Administration committee.

Cavanaugh also serves on the Manchester Board of Aldermen for Ward 1. He works as assistant business manager for IBEW Local 2320, a union representing electrical workers and other professions.

References

21st-century American politicians
Living people
Democratic Party New Hampshire state senators
People from Manchester, New Hampshire
Year of birth missing (living people)